The third season of the television series, Law & Order: Special Victims Unit premiered Friday, September 28, 2001 and ended Friday, May 17, 2002 on NBC. It occupied the Friday 10pm/9c timeslot once again.

Production
In the aftermath of 9/11, several cast and crew members volunteered to help the rescue effort. The main title voiceover by Steven Zirnkilton was also changed for one episode only to include the following dedication: 

Syndicated airings of the episodes replaced this dialogue with the original title voiceover. The opening sequence changed as well; NBC ordered the opening credits for the third season re-edited to remove images of the World Trade Center, which were seen at the beginning and ending; the credit sequences in the previous two seasons were not subsequently changed.

With David J. Burke having left the show at the end of the second season, Neal Baer was the sole showrunner / executive producer of Season 3. During the production of the third season, Baer convinced Amanda Green to begin writing scripts. Green was already serving as a consultant for the series while she worked for the NYPD. The episode "Counterfeit" became her debut as a writer. Tara Butters and Michele Fazekas who also joined the writing staff in the third season enjoyed the freedom of not having to meet with a large team in a writer's room. "As a result, there was no sense of competitiveness. We were working on our own so it was like writing your own mini-feature."

Cast changes and returning characters
All second season main cast members returned for the third season of the series. BD Wong returned to play forensic psychiatrist Dr. George Huang. He was originally contracted to appear in two episodes at the end of the second season and two episodes at the beginning of the third. As Wong puts it "They asked me to come and do four episodes as a kind of audition, to see if it worked, and after those four episodes they asked me to stay on." Wong credited the New York-based show with giving him the opportunity to regularly act in theatre.

Four cast members of SVU who would recur in subsequent years first appeared in the third season. In "Counterfeit," Robert John Burke began playing NYPD Internal Affairs Sergeant Ed Tucker when it is believed that the Special Victims Unit has been guilty of misconduct. Peter Hermann first played Defense Attorney Trevor Langan in "Monogamy," the episode on which Hermann and Hargitay, who would later marry, first met. The show later hinted in future seasons a light romantic flame between them. In "Surveillance," Joel de la Fuente first appears as the Technical Assistance Response Unit analyst Ruben Morales; at auditions the character was called "Burt Trevor," but this name was given to a different technician. Finally, Judith Light joined the recurring cast in "Guilt" as Alex Cabot's strict boss, Bureau Chief ADA Elizabeth Donnelly. Light was already a fan of the program, saying "You can see when you watch a show like this, the level of professionalism going into it."

Cast

Main cast
 Christopher Meloni as Senior Detective Elliot Stabler
 Mariska Hargitay as Junior Detective Olivia Benson
 Richard Belzer as Senior Detective John Munch
 Stephanie March as Assistant District Attorney Alexandra Cabot
 Ice-T as Junior Detective Odafin "Fin" Tutuola
 Dann Florek as Captain Donald "Don" Cragen

Crossover stars
 Dianne Wiest as Interim District Attorney Nora Lewin (Crossing over with Law & Order)

Recurring cast

 Susan Pellegrino as Dr. Barrett
  Jill Marie Lawrence as Defense Attorney Cleo Conrad
 Judith Light as Bureau Chief Assistant District Attorney Elizabeth Donnelly
Audrie Neenan as Judge Marilyn Haynes
 BD Wong as Dr. George Huang
 Ned Eisenberg as Defense Attorney Roger Kressler
 Peter Hermann as Defense Attorney Trevor Langan
 Lou Carbonneau as Crime Scene Unit Forensics Technician Harry Martin
 Joel de la Fuente as Technical Assistance Response Unit Technician Ruben Morales
 Joanna Merlin as Judge Lena Petrovsky

 Liz Larsen as Defense Attorney Regal
 Harvey Atkin as Judge Alan Ridenour
 Rob Bartlett as Defense Attorney Milton Schoenfeld
 Tom O'Rourke as Judge Mark Seligman
 Daniel Sunjata as Crime Scene Unit Forensics Technician Burt Trevor
 Fernando Lopez as Crime Scene Unit Forensics Technician Ramone Vargas
 Ron Leibman as Executive Assistant District Attorney Stan Villani
 Tamara Tunie as Medical Examiner Dr. Melinda Warner

Guest stars

The show "Wrath" has been repeatedly mentioned by Mariska Hargitay as one of her favorites. For the episode, Justin Kirk portrayed the wrongfully imprisoned man Eric Plummer. Upon being freed, he kills four people to exact revenge upon the police and Olivia Benson in particular. The scene in which Benson shoots Plummer was described as being very challenging to act. In an interview with Universal Channel, Hargitay said "I shot him dead and some things happened to me physically that I wasn't expecting." Although the video was cut to disguise it, Hargitay in fact mentions two Season 3 episodes in the interview. The second is "Inheritance" which shows Benson identify with a suspect who is a child of rape like herself. Marcus Chong played the suspect Darrell Guan who exemplifies the aggressive characteristics of his father.

The episode "Ridicule" portrayed a man as a victim of gang rape by women for the first time on network television. The victim Peter Smith was played by Pete Starrett while his rapists were played by Paige Turco and Diane Neal, who would later join the cast playing ADA Casey Novak in the fifth season after Stephanie March left the series. Mike Doyle portrayed Assistant Medical Examiner Karlan in the episode "Prodigy" before portraying CSU Forensics Technician Ryan O'Halloran in the fifth season.

Nick Chinlund guest starred as condemned serial killer Matthew Brodus in the episode "Execution". Chinlund had originally auditioned to portray the role of Detective Elliot Stabler. John Ritter guest starred as Dr. Manning, a psychiatrist who becomes the prime suspect in his wife's murder, in the episode "Monogamy". Ritter was praised for his performance in the episode, which aired shortly before his death; Michael Buckley of TV Guide wrote that "The gradual change in his demeanor makes for a memorable piece of acting."

Martha Plimpton was nominated for the Primetime Emmy Award for Outstanding Guest Actress in a Drama Series for her role in "Denial". She played Claire Rinato, a drug addict who is traumatized by having learned terrible things about her mother, played by Mary Steenburgen. Detective Tutuola tries to help her character recover from the addiction using his background as a narcotics detective. In "Guilt", Bret Harrison played Sam Cavanaugh, a child molestation victim who is reluctant to testify against his abuser. This appearance later helped Harrison secure his best known role in Reaper, which was created by the same writers as "Guilt".

In the second last episode, "Competence", a girl with Down Syndrome, played by Andrea Fay Friedman, struggles to prove that she is mentally competent to take care of a child. Lois Smith played the girl's mother and James Badge Dale played the girl's boyfriend. One of the writers of the episode, Robert F. Campbell, mentioned Lois Smith and "Competence" when reflecting on his favourite experiences as an SVU writer. The season finale "Silence" deals with sexual abuse in the Catholic Church. Eric Stoltz portrayed a priest who initially lies to protect clergymen higher up but eventually comes forward with the truth. Charlayne Woodard guest starred in the finale as Sister Peg, a role which she later reprised several times.

Episodes

References

Bibliography

External links
 Law & Order: Special Victims Unit Season 3 at TVGuide.com
 Law & Order: Special Victims Unit Season 3 - TV IV
 Season 3 episodes at IMDb.com

03
2001 American television seasons
2002 American television seasons